The 30th Daytime Emmy Awards ceremony, commemorating excellence in American daytime programming from 2002, was held on May 16, 2003 at Radio City Music Hall in New York City. Hosted by Wayne Brady, it was televised in the United States by ABC.

Creative Arts Emmy Awards were presented on May 10, 2003.

Nominations and winners
The following is a partial list of nominees, with winners in bold:

Outstanding Drama Series
As the World Turns
The Bold and the Beautiful
Port Charles
The Young and the Restless

Outstanding Lead Actor in a Drama Series
Grant Aleksander (Phillip Spaulding, Guiding Light)
Maurice Benard (Sonny Corinthos, General Hospital)
Doug Davidson (Paul Williams, The Young and the Restless)
Anthony Geary (Luke Spencer, General Hospital)
Ricky Paull Goldin (Gus Aitoro, Guiding Light)
Thorsten Kaye (Ian Thornhart, Port Charles)

Outstanding Lead Actress in a Drama Series
Eileen Davidson (Ashley Abbott Carlton, The Young and the Restless)
Susan Flannery (Stephanie Forrester, The Bold and the Beautiful)
Nancy Lee Grahn (Alexis Davis, General Hospital)
Michelle Stafford (Phyllis Summers Abbott, The Young and the Restless)
Kim Zimmer (Reva Shayne Lewis, Guiding Light)

Outstanding Supporting Actor in a Drama Series
Josh Duhamel (Leo du Pres, All My Children)
Benjamin Hendrickson (Hal Munson, As the World Turns)
Christian LeBlanc (Michael Baldwin, The Young and the Restless)
Ron Raines (Alan Spaulding, Guiding Light)
Paul Anthony Stewart (Danny Santos, Guiding Light)

Outstanding Supporting Actress in a Drama Series
Rebecca Budig (Greenlee Smythe, All My Children)
Robin Christopher (Skye Chandler, General Hospital)
Linda Dano (Rae Cummings, One Life to Live)
Vanessa Marcil (Brenda Barrett, General Hospital)
Cady McClain (Rosanna Cabot Montgomery, As the World Turns)
Kelly Monaco (Livvie Locke/Tess Ramsey, Port Charles)

Outstanding Younger Actor in a Drama Series
Chad Brannon (Zander Smith, General Hospital)
David Lago (Raul Guittierez, The Young and the Restless)
Kyle Lowder (Brady Black, Days of Our Lives)
Aiden Turner (Aidan Devane, All My Children)
Jordi Vilasuso (Tony Santos, Guiding Light)

Outstanding Younger Actress in a Drama Series
Jennifer Finnigan (Bridget Forrester, The Bold and the Beautiful)
Adrienne Frantz (Amber Moore, The Bold and the Beautiful)
Lindsey McKeon (Marah Lewis, Guiding Light)
Erin Hershey Presley (Alison Barrington, Port Charles)
Alicia Leigh Willis (Courtney Matthews, General Hospital)

Outstanding Drama Series Writing Team
All My Children
As the World Turns
The Bold and the Beautiful
General Hospital
Guiding Light
Passions
The Young and the Restless

Outstanding Drama Series Directing Team
All My Children
As the World Turns
Days of Our Lives
Passions

Outstanding Game/Audience Participation Show
Hollywood Squares
Jeopardy!
The Price is Right
Wheel of Fortune
Win Ben Stein's Money

Outstanding Game Show Host
Tom Bergeron, Hollywood Squares
Bob Barker, The Price is Right
Donny Osmond, Pyramid
Pat Sajak, Wheel of Fortune
Ben Stein and Sal Iacono, Win Ben Stein's Money
Alex Trebek, Jeopardy!

Outstanding Talk Show
Two winners were recorded in the Outstanding Talk Show category, as a tie was recorded in the race between The View and The Wayne Brady Show.

Dr. Phil
Live With Regis and Kelly
Soap Talk
The View
The Wayne Brady Show

Outstanding Talk Show Host
Wayne Brady, The Wayne Brady Show
Phil McGraw, Dr. Phil
Regis Philbin and Kelly Ripa, Live With Regis and Kelly
Lisa Rinna and Ty Treadway, Soap Talk
Barbara Walters, Meredith Vieira, Star Jones, Joy Behar and Lisa Ling, The View

Outstanding Service Show
Ask This Old House
The Christopher Lowell Show
Essence of Emeril
Martha Stewart Living
This Old House

Outstanding Service Show Host
Emeril Lagasse, Essence of Emeril
Christopher Lowell, The Christopher Lowell Show
Martha Stewart, Martha Stewart Living
Steve Thomas, This Old House

Outstanding Special Class Series
A Baby Story
Breakfast With The Arts
Judge Judy
Pop-up Video
While You Were Out

Outstanding Children's Animated Program
Arthur
Clifford the Big Red Dog
Dora the Explorer
Dragon Tales
Rugrats

Outstanding Sound Editing - Live Action and Animation
Robert Hargreaves, George Brooks and Giovanni Moscardino (X-Men: Evolution)
Rick Hinson, Gary Falcone, Joe Pizzulo, Elizabeth Hinso, Devon Bowman, Mark Mercado, Jeremy Pitts, Sanaa Cannella, Gregory Cathcart and Josh Mancell (Clifford the Big Red Dog)
Otis Van Osten, Jason Oliver, Rick Hammel and David Lynch (Fillmore!)
Mark Keatts, Kelly Ann Foley, Kerry Iverson, Mark Keefer, Jason Freedman, Cecil Broughton and Joe Sandusky (Ozzy & Drix)
Rick Livingstone and Dave Novak (Prehistoric Planet)

Outstanding Sound Mixing - Live Action and Animation
Marie-Pierre Lacombe, Benoît Coaillier and Stéphane Bergeron (Arthur)
Patrick Sellars and Neal Anderson (Barney & Friends)
Devon Bowman, Dan Cubert, Jeremy Pitts and Gregory Cathcart (Clifford the Big Red Dog)
Juan Aceves (Dora the Explorer)
Blake Norton, Dick Maitland and Bob Schott (Sesame Street)

Outstanding Special Class Animated Program
Static Shock
Madeline: My Fair Madeline
Ozzy & Drix
Rolie Polie Olie
Teacher's Pet

Outstanding Performer In An Animated Program
Mindy Cohn (Velma Dinkley, What's New, Scooby-Doo?)
Walter Cronkite (Benjamin Franklin, Liberty's Kids)
Ruby Dee (Alice the Great, Little Bill)
Gregory Hines, (Big Bill, Little Bill)
John Ritter (Clifford, Clifford the Big Red Dog)

Outstanding Pre-School Children's Series
Bear in the Big Blue House
Blue's Clues
Sesame Street

Outstanding Children's Series
Assignment Discovery
Between the Lions
Even Stevens
Reading Rainbow
ZOOM

Outstanding Directing in a Children's Series
Mitchell Kriegman and Dean Gordon (Bear in the Big Blue House)
Lisa Simon, Emily Squires, Richard A. Fernandes and Bill Berner (Between the Lions)
Bruce Caines, Alan Zdinak, Koyalee Chanda and Dave Palmer (Blue's Clues)
Ed Wiseman (Reading Rainbow)
Ted May, Emily Squires, Victor DiNapoli, Ken Diego, Lisa Simon and Jim Martin (Sesame Street)

Outstanding Performer in a Children's Series
LeVar Burton (Himself, Reading Rainbow)
Kevin Clash (Elmo, Sesame Street)
Shia LaBeouf (Louis Stevens, Even Stevens)
Noel MacNeal (Bear, Bear in the Big Blue House)
Donna Pescow (Eileen Stevens, Even Stevens)

Outstanding Performer in a Children's Special
Tom Cavanagh (Val Duncan, Bang Bang You're Dead)
Ben Foster (Trevor Adams, Bang Bang You're Dead)
Gregory Hines (Zeke, The Red Sneakers )
Bernadette Peters (Bailey Lewis, Bobbie's Girl)
Vanessa L. Williams (Sandra Williams, Our America)

Outstanding Children's Special
William Mastrosimone, Norman Stephens, Paul Hellerman and Deboragh Gabler (Bang Bang You're Dead)
Joseph Stern, Angela Bassett, Eda Godel Hallinan and Armand Leo (Our America)
Jane Paley and Larry Price (Table Talk: Talking Beyond 9/11)
Kate Taylor, Jim Johnston, Kathleen Shugrue, Paul Serafini, Marcy Gunther and Kathy Waugh (Zoom: America's Kids Remember)

Outstanding Directing in a Children's Special
Guy Ferland (Bang Bang You're Dead)
Danny Glover (Just a Dream) 
Gregory Hines (The Red Sneakers)

Outstanding Writing in a Children's Special
William Mastrosimone (Bang Bang You're Dead)
Gordon Rayfield (Our America)

Outstanding Single Camera Photography (Film or Electronic)
Ernest R. Dickerson (Our America)
Garry Nardilla, Stephen Murello and Frankie DeJoseph (Martha Stewart Living)
Joel Shapiro Ari Haberberg and Jimmy O'Donnell (Reading Rainbow)
Stephen J. D'Onofrio (Ask This Old House)

Lifetime Achievement Award
Art Linkletter

References
 
 
 

030
Daytime Emmy Awards

it:Premi Emmy 2003#Premi Emmy per il Daytime